David Sims is the name of:

David Sims (running back) (born 1955), former American football running back with the Seattle Seahawks
David Sims (safety) (born 1986), American football safety for the Indianapolis Colts
Dave Sims (born 1953), Seattle-based sportscaster
Dave Sims (rugby union) (1969–2022), rugby player
Dave Sims (swimmer), member of the USA's 1980 Olympic team
David Sims (biologist) (born 1969), professor in marine biology
David Sims (photographer) (born 1966), British fashion and beauty photographer
David Wm. Sims (born 1963), American musician
David Sims (director) (born 1948), New Zealand Film director

See also
Dave Sim (born 1956), Canadian comic book writer
Dave Sime (1936–2016), athlete
David J. Simms (1933-2018), Indian-born Irish mathematician